Juho Nykänen (born 11 September 1985) is a Finnish footballer currently playing for Kotkan Työväen Palloilijat.

References
kups.fi Profile
Veikkausliiga Hall of Fame

1985 births
Living people
People from Kotka
Finnish footballers
Kuopion Palloseura players
Veikkausliiga players
Kotkan Työväen Palloilijat players
Association football midfielders
Sportspeople from Kymenlaakso